The 2009–10 season is Central Coast's 5th season since the inception of the A-League.

Players

Senior squad

Youth League squad

Transfers

In

Out

Loan out

Pre-season and friendlies

2009-10 Hyundai A-League fixtures

Statistics

Appearances

|-
|colspan="14"|Players who made appearances but left the club during the season:

|}

Goalscorers
Includes all competitive matches. The list is sorted by shirt number when total goals are equal.

References

2009-10
2009–10 A-League season by team